Ante Slobodan Novak (3 November 1924 – 25 July 2016) was a Croatian writer and novelist. He is best known for his novel Gold, Frankincense and Myrrh (1968), often listed as one of the best Croatian novels of the 20th century.

Biography

Novak was born in Split on 3 November 1924 to Duje and Marija (née Smoje) Novak. He was baptized in the local church as Ante Slobodan Novak. He finished elementary school in Rab, attended the Classical gymnasium in Split, then graduated in Sušak. During World War II he joined the Yugoslav Partisans, which he described in his autobiographical essays Digresije and Protimbe (2003).

He then attended the University of Zagreb and earned a degree in Croatian and Yugoslav literature in 1953. He worked as an instructor, proofreader, and playwright for the Croatian National Theatre in Split. Later he worked as a journalist and an editor in various publishing houses. In 1983 he became a member of the Croatian Academy of Sciences and Arts. On 27 July 1999, Novak was declared an Honorary Citizen of Rab.

Literary work

He started his career with songs full of painful memories from the war. Verses were gathered in his work Glasnice u oluji (1950). Soon he started to write fiction: he published Krugovima and Republici. He gained the attention of critics and the public by publishing his autobiographical novel Izgubljeni zavičaj (1955), in which he dealt with his childhood on a lonely island.

The narrator appears in two characters: in infantile “I” where he observes, registers and absorbs everything around him; and the second character as today's “I” where he, with a sentimental and quiet dose of resignation, recreates his memories and images from youth. His novel Mirisi, zlato i tamjan was published in 1968. This is a story about a retired middle-aged intellectual who lives with his wife on an isolated island; he lives his life and nurtures the very old Madona Markantunova, a former rich patrician woman and owner of half of the island. The story takes place in the 1960s. Novak follows the same thematic and poetic line in his short novel Izvanbrodski dnevnik published in 1977.

Later, Novak published a collection of interviews with Jelena Hekman in Digresije in 2001. He later published Protimbe (2003) which he considered as an expansion of Digresije. Protimbe is one of the greatest works of Croatian autobiographical prose, rich with reminiscences and associations on youth, political and social life in SFR Yugoslavia, on the writer's experiences during the Croatian War of Independence, and on subsequent changes politically and socially.

Works

Awards and decorations

Awards

Decorations

References

Sources
 HAZU - Biography

Croatian novelists
Male novelists
Croatian essayists
Croatian male writers
Male essayists
Vladimir Nazor Award winners
Writers from Split, Croatia
Members of the Croatian Academy of Sciences and Arts
1924 births
2016 deaths
Order of Duke Trpimir recipients
Place of death missing